Sudha Shah (born 22 June 1958) is a former Test and One Day International cricketer who represented India. She also represented Tamil Nadu and South Zone in India's domestic competitions. She played a total of 21 Tests and 13 One Day Internationals.

In June 2018, she was awarded with the Lifetime Achievement Award by the Board of Control for Cricket in India (BCCI).

References

1958 births
Living people
Sportspeople from Kannur
India women One Day International cricketers
India women Test cricketers
Indian women cricketers
Cricketers from Kerala
Sportswomen from Kerala

Indian cricket coaches
Tamil Nadu women cricketers
20th-century Indian women
20th-century Indian people